The following is a chronological list of Australian players who have played at least one game in the Women's National Basketball Association (WNBA). The list includes both past and present players. Active WNBA players are shown in bold.

Australian WNBA Players 

Key

a Annie La Fleur was born in Port Moresby, Papua New Guinea,  but moved to Australia as a child with her parents.
b Jay Kingi-Cross was born in Wellington, New Zealand, but moved to Australia with her parents at age 4.
c Leilani Mitchell was born in Richland, Washington USA to an Australian mother and American father and has dual citizenship. In December 2013, Mitchell pledged her allegiances to, and represents Australia internationally.
d Kelsey Griffin was born in Anchorage, Alaska USA. Having obtained Australian citizenship in November 2015, Griffin pledged her allegiances to, and represents Australia internationally.
e Liz Cambage was born in London, England, to a Nigerian father and Australian mother, but moved to Australia with her mother at three months old.
f Sami Whitcomb was born and raised in Ventura, California.  In February 2018, Whitcomb became an Australian citizen and represents Australia internationally.
g Ezi Magbegor was born in Wellington, New Zealand, but moved to Australia at six years old.

See also

 Australia women's national basketball team
 Australia under-19 women's national basketball team
 Basketball Australia
 Women's National Basketball League
 WNBL Most Valuable Player Award
 List of foreign WNBA players
 List of Women's National Basketball Association players
 List of Australian NBA players
 List of Serbian WNBA players

References 

Australian, List
Australian Wnba
Wnbs
 
Employment of foreign-born